David Alvin Wissman (born February 17, 1941) is an American former professional baseball player who appeared in 16 games during part of one season in Major League Baseball for the Pittsburgh Pirates in , primarily as a left fielder. He attended the University of Bridgeport.

Wissman was signed by the Pirates as an amateur free agent in 1961 and was recalled to Pittsburgh after his fourth minor-league season in 1964. He started four games, and otherwise appeared as a pinch hitter or defensive replacement. In his 16 MLB games, he collected four hits in 27 at bats, all singles, for a .148 batting average, with two runs scored. He played through the 1967 minor-league campaign before leaving the game.

External links

1941 births
Living people
Asheville Tourists players
Baseball players from Massachusetts
Batavia Pirates players
Columbus Jets players
Grand Forks Chiefs players
Kingsport Pirates players
Major League Baseball left fielders
People from Greenfield, Massachusetts
Pittsburgh Pirates players
Toledo Mud Hens players